William Foster Cockshutt (October 17, 1855 – November 22, 1939) was a Canadian politician.

Born in Brantford, Canada West, the son of Ignatius Cockshutt, Cockshutt was educated in Brantford and at the Galt College Institute. He worked for a produce firm and in a tea warehouse in England before returning to Ontario and entering the family business in partnership with his brother James. A merchant and manufacturer, he was a member of the Hydro-Electric Power Commission. He was president of the Cockshutt Plow Company from 1885 until 1888, stepping in after his brother's death from tuberculosis at 34 years of age. In 1888, he was named president of the local Board of Trade.

Cockshutt was an unsuccessful candidate in the federal riding of Brant South in 1887. He was first elected to the House of Commons of Canada for the electoral district of Brantford in the 1904 general elections. A Conservative, he was defeated in 1908. He was re-elected in 1911 and 1917. He was defeated again in 1921. He was an honorary colonel of the 125th Battalion, Canadian Expeditionary Force.

In 1891, he married Minnie Turner Ashton.

Electoral record

See also 
 Bell Telephone Memorial

References 
 Citations

 Bibliography

 
 The Canadian Parliament; biographical sketches and photo-engravures of the senators and members of the House of Commons of Canada. Being the tenth Parliament, elected November 3, 1904

1855 births
1939 deaths
Conservative Party of Canada (1867–1942) MPs
Members of the House of Commons of Canada from Ontario